Polk Township, Missouri may refer to one of the following places:

 Polk Township, Adair County, Missouri
 Polk Township, Atchison County, Missouri
 Polk Township, Cass County, Missouri
 Polk Township, Dade County, Missouri
 Polk Township, DeKalb County, Missouri
 Polk Township, Madison County, Missouri
 Polk Township, Nodaway County, Missouri
 Polk Township, Ray County, Missouri
 Polk Township, St. Clair County, Missouri
 Polk Township, Sullivan County, Missouri
 and also:
East Polk Township, Christian County, Missouri
West Polk Township, Christian County, Missouri

See also

Polk Township (disambiguation)

Missouri township disambiguation pages